Jack Bernard "JB" Murphy (born 22 October 1999) is an Irish racing cyclist, who currently rides for UCI Continental team .

Major results

Track
2018
 3rd Keirin, National Championships 
2021
 3rd  Scratch, UEC European Championships

Road
2019
 1st Stage 4 Rás Mumhan
 3rd Overall Tour of Ulster
1st Stage 2

Cyclo-cross
2016–2017
 1st  National Junior Championships

References

External links

1999 births
Living people
Irish male cyclists
Irish track cyclists
People from County Kildare